Stéphane Laporte (born 17 July 1966 in Lyon, Rhône) is a retired track and field athlete from France, who competed in the men's javelin throw event during his career. He represented France at the 1988 Summer Olympics in Seoul, South Korea, where he didn't reach the final after throwing 69.40 metres in the qualification round.

Achievements

References 

1966 births
Living people
French male javelin throwers
Athletes (track and field) at the 1988 Summer Olympics
Olympic athletes of France
Athletes from Lyon